The Holtemme is a  long tributary of the river Bode in Saxony-Anhalt, Germany.

It rises in the Harz mountains at the eastern foot of the Brocken, descends during its upper course as the Steinerne Renne, a steep stream bed riddled with granite rocks, flows through Hasserode, Wernigerode and past their villages of Minsleben and Silstedt, through Derenburg and Halberstadt and discharges into the Bode.

In Wernigerode, not far from the western gate, the Zillierbach, which is also known as the Flutrenne, merges into the Holtemme.

Rivers of Saxony-Anhalt
Rivers of the Harz
Rivers of Germany